Dafne may refer to:

Arts
 Dafne, a 1597 opera by Jacopo Peri
 La Dafne, a 1608 opera by Marco da Gagliano
 Dafne (Opitz–Schütz), a 1627 opera by Martin Opitz and Heinrich Schütz

Other uses
 Dafne (given name)
 DAFNE, a particle collider in Italy
 Dose adjustment for normal eating, a strategy in insulin therapy

See also 
 Dafni (disambiguation)
 Daphne (disambiguation)